EuroComics is an imprint of The Library of American Comics and IDW Publishing, which publishes European comics and graphic novels.

Publications

References 

 EuroComics catalogue

Comics by company
Comic book publishing companies of the United States
Lists of comics by publisher
IDW Publishing